Anisodamine, also known as 7β-hydroxyhyoscyamine, is an anticholinergic and α1 adrenergic receptor antagonist used in the treatment of acute circulatory shock in China. It is given orally or by injection, as a racemic mixture (racanisodamine) or as a hydrobromide salt. Eye drops at 0.5% concentration for slowing the progression of myopia is also available in China.

Anisodamine is a naturally occurring tropane alkaloid found in some plants of the family Solanaceae including Datura. Its Mandarin Chinese name  is given after Anisodus tanguticus.

See also 
 Anisodine
 Atropine, used for similar cardiac and optamological purposes elsewhere
 Hyoscyamine

References 

Alpha-1 blockers
Muscarinic antagonists
Tropane alkaloids
Tropane alkaloids found in Solanaceae